Mango Books, known as children's imprint in English, is a subset of DC Books. Mango's publications fall into every category such as fiction, children's literature, poetry, reference, classics, folktales and biographies. Mango has also licensed content to Real Reads, UK.

The Mango Editorial office is located in Ernakulam, Kerala, India. Mango has a four-member editorial team with Saraswathy Rajagopalan as its executive editor.

History and overview 

Mango Books, founded in 2007 and originally called Tumbi, morphed into Mango in October 2008. In 2014, Mango launched a new series titled Spooky Stories (The Girl in the Mirror, As Strange as it Gets, Stories to Scare, Whispers from Under the Bed and Ghost Stories from Bengal and Beyond) which became hugely popular among children in a short period of time.

The Mango Classics edition of Ramayana sold record copies worldwide. Titles from Mango from the series, Mango Classics, Folktales and Collected Stories are bestsellers in the market, including world classics like Hamlet, Emma, The Time Machine, The Tempest, Great Expectations, Tom Sawyer, Dracula, Frankenstein, A Christmas Carol, Macbeth, Wuthering Heights, Pride and Prejudice, Romeo and Juliet, The Hound of the Baskervilles and The Lost World among the others. Among the classics, there are also some very interesting tales from Indian Mythology, including Karna and Krishna, as well as the must-read tales from Indian history including Rani Lakshmibai, Shivaji and Ashoka. The collected tales of Panchatantra and Jataka Tales have received positive reviews all around. Mango publishes its own yearbook every year, which is a comprehensive reference book to meet the academic requirements of students.

Mango also has its own original textbook series for schools, The English Express: A Skill-based Interactive Series which intends to develop English language skills in children, encourage their creativity, and develop their communication and social skills. The lessons, exercises, illustrations and design in the course for classes 1 to 8 are methodically planned and crafted.

Notable contributors 

Acclaimed authors like Anita Nair, Jaishree Misra, Anjana Vaswani and Nandini Nayar have worked with Mango, and creative artists and visual story-tellers like K.R. Raji, Lavanya Karthik and Aniruddha Mukherjee have also contributed to its success.

Awards and recognition 

The Talking Handkerchief written by Mumbai-based author Anjana Vaswani won the Sharjah International Children's Book Award at the Sharjah Book Fair 2016. FIP (Federation of Indian Publishers) Award was won by Mango's Apoorva's Fat Diary and Rani Lakshmibai, both authored by Nandini Nayar. A good number of Mango Books titles also have e-books and audio books.

Mango was featured as the fastest-growing independent publisher from 2016 to 2018 on Publishers Weekly's  Fast-Growing Independent Publisher list in 2019.

References

External links 
 

Book publishing companies of India
Publishing companies established in 2007
Companies based in Kerala
2007 establishments in Kerala
Indian companies established in 2007